The 1896–97 Northern Football League season was the eighth in the history of the Northern Football League, a football competition in Northern England.

Clubs

The league featured 7 clubs which competed in the last season, along with three new clubs:
 Crook Town
 Leadgate Park
 Darlington St. Augustine's

League table

References

1896-97
1896–97 in English association football leagues